Yūsuke Nakanishi is a Japanese politician who is a member of the House of Councillors of Japan.

Biography 
He was educated at Keio University. In 2010, he was elected to the house of councillors and was re-elected in 2016 and 2022.

References 

Living people
Members of the House of Councillors (Japan)
Keio University alumni
1979 births